Beta Ethniki 2000–01 complete season.

League table

Results

Relegation play-off

|}

Top scorers

References

External links
RSSSF.org

Second level Greek football league seasons
Greece
2